Nematogmus is a genus of dwarf spiders that was first described by Eugène Louis Simon in 1884.

Species
 it contains nine species:
Nematogmus asiaticus Tanasevitch, 2014 – Laos, Thailand, Indonesia (Sumatra)
Nematogmus dentimanus Simon, 1886 – Sri Lanka to Malaysia, Indonesia (Java, Krakatau)
Nematogmus digitatus Fei & Zhu, 1994 – China
Nematogmus longior Song & Li, 2008 – China
Nematogmus membranifer Song & Li, 2008 – China
Nematogmus nigripes Hu, 2001 – China
Nematogmus rutilis Oi, 1960 – Japan
Nematogmus sanguinolentus (Walckenaer, 1841) (type) – Europe, North Africa, Caucasus, China, Korea, Japan
Nematogmus stylitus (Bösenberg & Strand, 1906) – China, Japan

See also
 List of Linyphiidae species (I–P)

References

Araneomorphae genera
Linyphiidae
Spiders of Asia